Royal Hotel may refer to:

 The Royal Hotel, Riebeek Kasteel, Western Cape, South Africa, a historic hotel
 Le Royal Hotel (Amman), Jordan
 Royal Hotel, Cardiff, Wales, UK
 Radisson Blu Royal Hotel, Copenhagen, Denmark, originally the SAS Royal Hotel
 Royal Hotel, Great Yarmouth, England
 Royal Hotel, Maryborough, Queensland, Australia
 Royal Hotel, Birdsville, Queensland, Australia
 Royal Hotel (Oran), Algeria
 Radisson Royal Hotel, Moscow, Russia
 Royal Hotel, Norwich, England
 Royal Hotel, Birmingham, England
 Royal Hotel, Perth, Western Australia
 Royal George Hotel (disambiguation)
 Royal Hotel (Honey Harbour), Ontario
 Royal Hotel, Bathurst, New South Wales, Australia
 Royal Hotel, Cooma, New South Wales, Australia
 Royal Hotel, Scarborough, England
 Royal Hotel, Weymouth, Dorset, England